Lukas Pachner (born 5 December 1991) is an Austrian snowboarder. He competed in the 2018 Winter Olympics.

References

1991 births
Living people
Snowboarders at the 2018 Winter Olympics
Snowboarders at the 2022 Winter Olympics
Austrian male snowboarders
Olympic snowboarders of Austria